Nicolas Durand (born 4 October 1982 in Toulouse, France) is a French rugby union footballer who plays scrum-half for USAP in France's Top 14 competition. His first professional club was Toulouse whom he played for in 2002. From 2002 until 2004 he played for Béziers. Upon their relegation to Pro D2 after the 2003–04 season, he moved to Perpignan, where he played for six seasons before arriving in Paris for the 2010–11 season.

Durand has played age grade level representative rugby for France's Under 18, Under 19, and Under 21 teams. He has also played twice for France. In May 2007 he was selected for France's Test squad to play the All Blacks in New Zealand, and made his Test début against the All Blacks on 2 June 2007.

References

External links

1982 births
Living people
French rugby union players
Rugby union scrum-halves
Racing 92 players
USA Perpignan players
RC Toulonnais players
France international rugby union players
Rugby union players from Toulouse
Stade Toulousain players
AS Béziers Hérault players
Lyon OU players